"Dream All Day" is a song by the American alternative rock band The Posies, released as the first single released from its album Frosting on the Beater in 1993.

Track listing

"Dream All Day"
"How She Lied by Living"
"Ever Since I Was Alone" (demo version)
"Open Every Window" (demo version)

Notes
The demo of "Ever Since I Was Alone" was recorded on Ken's 4 track at home, October 1992. The version of "Open Every Window" is Jon's demo, recorded at Egg Studios, summer 1991. This was the first single that the Posies released in the UK.

Charts

References

1993 singles
Songs written by Ken Stringfellow
Songs written by Jon Auer
1993 songs
DGC Records singles